Allan Adams is an American physicist and oceanographer.  His research in physics has focused on string theory, QFT, and fluid dynamics, while his work in oceanography and ocean engineering have focused on high-precision optical sensing and imaging and on low-cost scalable instrumentation.   He currently leads the Future Ocean Lab at Massachusetts Institute of Technology and is a visiting oceanographer at the Woods Hole Oceanographic Institution.

Adams earned degrees in physics from Harvard College, UC Berkeley, and Stanford University before joining the faculty of the MIT Department of Physics in 2008.  Adams opened the Future Ocean Lab at MIT in January of 2017, and became a Visiting Investigator at the Woods Hole Oceanographic Institution in 2018.  In 2021, Adams co-founded Station B, a non-profit ocean engineering field station in Bermuda. 

Adams is an avid sailplane pilot, cave diver, and father of two boys.  He is married to MIT cognitive neuroscientist Rebecca Saxe.

Awards and recognition 

Adams was a Junior Fellow in the Harvard Society of Fellows before joining the faculty at MIT. Adams has received numerous awards for his teaching and monitorship, including MIT’s School of Science Teaching Prize, the Buechner Teaching and Advising Prizes, and the Baker Memorial Award.  His introductory lectures on Quantum Mechanics are freely available via MIT OpenCourseWare and have been viewed more than 10 million times.  His talks on gravitational waves at TED 2016 and TED 2014 have been viewed more than 4.7 million times.

Selected publications 

 Don't Panic! Closed String Tachyons in ALE Spacetimes.
 String universality in ten dimensions.
  Sigma Models in AdS_4.
 Disordered Holographic Systems I & II.
 GLSMs for non-Kähler Geometries.
 Holographic Vortex Liquids and Superfluid Turbulence.
 Holographic Turbulence.

References 

Year of birth missing (living people)
Living people
American physicists
Massachusetts Institute of Technology School of Science faculty
Stanford University alumni
UC Berkeley College of Letters and Science alumni
Harvard College alumni